Ozeki or Ōzeki may refer to:

 Ōzeki, a rank in Makuuchi, the top division of professional sumo 
 List of ōzeki
 Ōzeki station (disambiguation), the name of two railway stations in Japan
 Ōzeki Masutoshi (1849–1905), 16th daimyō of Kurobane Domain in Shimotsuke Province, Japan
 Ruth Ozeki (born 1956), American-Canadian author
 Tatsuya Ozeki (born 1976), a Japanese baseball player
 Tokiko Ozeki (born 1950), a Japanese cross-country skier
 Yukie Ozeki (fl. 1971–1975), a Japanese female international table tennis player
 Shinya Ozeki, a character in the manga series Hinomaru Sumo
 10760 Ozeki, a minor planet

See also